Draci Brno (English: Brno Dragons) is a baseball team from Brno, Czech Republic. The team plays in the Czech Extraliga.

History
Draci Brno was founded as Slavia Brno VŠZ in 1972. In 1973, the team won the Czechoslovak amateur softball tournament and the next year they were invited to join the newly created national league organized by the Czechoslovak Association of Physical Education. Since then, the club has played every season on the top tier of Czechoslovak/Czech baseball, except for the 1993 season, when they were forced to play in a lower level league. That same year, the team changed its name to VSK VŠZ Draci Brno.

Draci Brno won their first Extraliga title in 1995 and won every season back to back from 1995 to 2010. The club has the most titles with a total of 22.

In 2016 the team participated in and won the inaugural and only season of the Euro League Baseball.

Roster

Euro League Baseball
Draci Brno is one of the four teams to start in the inaugural season of the Euro League Baseball.

Achievements
 Extraliga : 22 (1995, 1996, 1997, 1998, 1999, 2000, 2001, 2002, 2003, 2004, 2005, 2006, 2007, 2008, 2009, 2010, 2012, 2013, 2014, 2016, 2017, 2020)
 CEB Cup winner : 1 (2017)
 3rd European Cup : 2 (1998, 2004)

References

External links
 Official club webpage

Baseball in the Czech Republic
Sport in Brno